Anders Mus (died 1535) was a Danish bishop, military officer and civil servant in Norway.

He served as a captain  in Bergen, Norway from 1501 and for a time was provost in Viborg in Jutland. He came to Oslo in 1506 and served as Bishop of the Diocese of Oslo from 1506 to 1521. He had the support of  Erik Valkendorf, who was elected Archbishop of Nidaros in 1510. In 1516 he was also inducted as captain  at Akershus Fortress. He was additionally made a member of the Norwegian State Council. He died in 1535, probably near Tønsberg.

References

Year of birth unknown
1535 deaths
16th-century Roman Catholic bishops in Norway
16th-century Danish clergy